Montero (stylised in all caps) is the debut studio album by American rapper and singer Lil Nas X, released on September 17, 2021, by Columbia Records. Five singles supported Montero: the lead single "Montero (Call Me by Your Name)", "Sun Goes Down", "Industry Baby", "Thats What I Want", and "Lost in the Citadel". "Montero (Call Me by Your Name)" and “Industry Baby”  topped the U.S. Billboard Hot 100, while "Thats What I Want" peaked within the top ten.

The album has guest appearances from Jack Harlow, Doja Cat, Elton John, Megan Thee Stallion, and Miley Cyrus. Musically, Montero is a pop rap record with influence from various other genres. It received critical acclaim from music critics, who praised its eclectic production and catchy songwriting. At the 64th Annual Grammy Awards, it received a nomination for Album of the Year making his second nomination in three years in the category, while "Montero (Call Me by Your Name)" was nominated for Record of the Year, Song of the Year and Best Music Video, and "Industry Baby" was nominated for Best Melodic Rap Performance, respectively. Lil Nas X also performed "Dead Right Now" during the ceremony.

Commercially, the album topped the charts in Australia, Denmark, Ireland, New Zealand, Norway, and Sweden. It peaked at number two on the US Billboard 200, also entering the top 10 in numerous other territories.

Background
In 2018, Lil Nas X released his song "Old Town Road", which set a record for the longest-charting number-one song on the Billboard Hot 100. However, with some people dismissing his success as a one-hit wonder, Lil Nas X wanted to depart from the country trap sound of "Old Town Road" when working on his debut album; instead, he focused on rap, pop, and R&B, influenced by Drake, Nicki Minaj, Katy Perry, Miley Cyrus, and Doja Cat. After releasing the EP 7, he said he was working on an album, noting that it was going to be more personal. In early 2020, he asked Take a Daytrip, a production duo who helped with 7, to produce his debut album, and started recording a series of demos during the 2020 COVID-19 lockdowns.

Months into production, Lil Nas X teased the album's lead single "Montero (Call Me by Your Name)" on Twitter, with positive reception. The track was later teased again in a Super Bowl commercial for Swiss hardware manufacturer Logitech, before its release was announced publicly alongside a music video directed by the Ukrainian music video director Tanu Muino on March 26, 2021. The album's second single "Sun Goes Down" came shortly after on May 21, 2021, which followed the theme of homosexuality seen in much of the final release. Both tracks were performed on Saturday Night Live just a day later on May 22, 2021. After the release of "Montero (Call Me by Your Name)," the popular art collective MSCHF partnered with Lil Nas X to release a modified version of the Nike Air Max 97 dubbed Satan Shoes which were temporally available on MSCHF's website. Nike was quick to sue MSCHF, which lead to a court case that was settled a month later. As a promotional technique for the project's third single "Industry Baby", Lil Nas X took to TikTok to announce that a mock court hearing would be held on the single's release date on July 23, 2021. The announcement was bundled with a promotional video featuring a fake court hearing which acted as the precursor to the song's music video, directed by Christian Breslauer of the music video production company London Alley. An early version of the album was leaked with unfinished versions of songs online on July 27. Also, 13 songs were leaked by the same person that never made it to the final release.

On August 26, 2021, Lil Nas X formally announced Montero in a promotional skit posted onto his YouTube channel. In the promotional video, the track "Thats What I Want" was teased as the album's fourth single. On September 17, 2021, the song and its accompanying music video was released along with the rest of the project. Sony Music Italy released "Lost in the Citadel" for radio airplay in Italy on April 8, 2022, as the album's fifth single.

Release and promotion
On March 26, 2021, following the release of "Montero (Call Me by Your Name)", Lil Nas X announced the title of the album Montero on Twitter, along with a 2021 release date. On June 29, 2021, a parody of the Marvel Studios production logo was uploaded to YouTube as a new trailer for the album featuring various clips from the music videos of his singles. On August 23, 2021, a partnership with Taco Bell to promote the album was announced, with Lil Nas X playing a role in "menu innovations". The album's release date was announced through another teaser video uploaded to YouTube on August 26, 2021. The video acted as a continuation of the music video for the third single "Industry Baby".

The track listing was announced on September 1, 2021. Alongside the announcement, collaborations with Doja Cat, Elton John, Megan Thee Stallion, and Miley Cyrus were revealed. In early September of 2021, Lil Nas X participated in a fake pregnancy photoshoot, with the supposed baby being his album. He was inspired to do so by Megan Thee Stallion's verse on the track "Dolla Sign Slime". To accompany this, he created a "baby registry" which was used to gather donations for various LGBT charities. The album cover was created by artists Pilar Zeta and Charlotte Rutherford.

Montero was released on September 17, 2021, by Columbia Records. The album's launch was preceded by a livestream on YouTube showing Lil Nas X being interviewed by Montero, played by himself, on a fictional daytime talk show titled The Montero Show, before being sent to the hospital in an emergency to "give birth to his album".

Tour

On April 26, 2022, Lil Nas X announced a concert tour to support the debut album, Montero. The tour, titled Long Live Montero Tour, will be his first headlining concert tour, and will begin on September 6, 2022 in Detroit, and conclude on November 17, 2022 in Barcelona. Tickets for North American dates went on sale on April 29, with European dates to follow on May 6. Mobile payment service, Cash App, held pre-sales for North American dates on April 27 via Ticketmaster. In early September 2022, the artist announced that he'll play an exclusive show in Sydney. The show is set at the Hordern Pavilion on January 4, 2023.

Music and lyrics

Montero has been described as a pop rap record. Primarily rooted in hip-hop and pop, the hook-dominated album incorporates trap beats and distorted hard rock, and draws elements from 2000s R&B and stadium ballads.

Critical reception

Montero received acclaim from music critics, who often commended its bold and heartfelt subject matter, and the eclectic production. At Metacritic, which assigns a normalized rating out of 100 to reviews from professional publications, the album received an average score of 85 based on 19 reviews, indicating "universal acclaim". Aggregator AnyDecentMusic? gave it 7.8 out of 10, based on their assessment of the critical consensus.

Mike Wass of Variety praises how the project isn't shy to "give voice to the fears and longings of a generation of queer kids", citing the project's lead single "Montero (Call Me by Your Name)" to be "one of the most defiantly queer chart-toppers of all time" and that the track ranks as "the ultimate earworm on the album". Meanwhile, Alexis Petridis of The Guardian gave the album a five-star review in which he praised the album's lyrics, variety and change in tone halfway through, while also noting the album rollout's use of product placement, citing prominent advertising for American fast-food giant Taco Bell and the popular food delivery app Uber Eats. Melissa Ruggieri of USA Today highlighted the work of production duo Take a Daytrip, praising how the duo "pilot his music through valleys of beats and peaks of melody" and how it leads to "a pleasant exploratory ride" throughout the duration of the project. Eric Torres of Pitchfork comments that Montero helps "fulfills the promise of [turning Lil Nas X into] a new kind of pop star", mentioning that the album's contents are "radio-primed to work well beside Olivia Rodrigo's pop-punk or Doja's earworm rap".

Reviewing the album for AllMusic, Neil Z. Yeung called it "A breath of fresh air" and "one of those instant classics, packed with as many catchy jams as introspective musings." Concluding the four-star review for Evening Standard, David Smyth stated that "From slinky pop rap on 'Scoop' to tortured rock on 'Life After Salem', he's doing it all, and against the odds, proving that he has a long bright career ahead." At Clash Magazine, Laviea Thomas gave praise to the album, for being "one of 2021’s most daring, riveting, and honest pop statement[s]."

NME's El Hunt was amongst the few reviewers to give a more divided opinion on the album, claiming that "Without visuals to add a knowing wink and a flourish of pop absurdity, it sometimes settles into a comfortable groove of trap-influenced drum beats, moody instrumentals, Frank Ocean-y electric guitars and percussive brass peals." The Observers Kitty Empire was also mildly critical, stating that she felt Lil Nas X "resorts to mainstream genre cliches rather than razing convention as he did on 'Old Town Road'." Reviewing in his Substack-published "Consumer Guide" column, Robert Christgau gave Montero a three-star honorable mention and named "Tales of Dominica", "Sun Goes Down", and "Scoop" as highlights, while summing up the release as "fluke country-rap meisterhitman croons songful enough gay pop bildungsalbum for a biz that has yet to generate enough of them".

In June 2022, Rolling Stone ranked Montero #151 on its list of The 200 Greatest Rap Albums of All Time.

Year-end lists

Commercial performance
Montero was the most pre-added album on Apple Music two weeks preceding its release (August 27 to September 2, 2021), one place ahead of ABBA's Voyage (2021). The album debuted at number two on the Billboard 200 with first-week sales of 126,000 equivalent units, of which 22,000 were pure album sales. The album also spawned two Billboard Hot 100 hits: "Montero (Call Me by Your Name)", which peaked at number 1 on April 10, 2021, and "Industry Baby", which peaked at number 1 on October 23, 2021. "That's What I Want" also reached the top ten, peaking at number eight on April 2, 2022.

Track listing

Notes
 denotes a producer who also produced the vocals
 denoted additional producer
 miscellaneous producer
 vocal producer only
 The chorus of "Dont Want It" contains a portion of the flow and lyrics from "Mockingbird" written by Eminem.

Credits

Musicians

 Montero Hill – lead vocals (all tracks), background vocals (1–3, 6, 8–11, 15), whistles (14)
 Denzel Baptiste – bass, keyboards, programming (1–3, 6, 9–11, 13, 15); vocals (1–3, 6 9–11, 15), guitar (2), background vocals (3, 13)
 David Biral – bass, keyboards, programming, (1–3, 6, 9–11, 13, 15); vocals (1–3, 6 9–11, 15), background vocals (13)
 Omer Fedi – guitar (1, 4, 10, 11, 13, 15), vocals (1, 10, 11, 15), bass (4, 15); background vocals, drums, keyboards (4)
 Roy Lenzo – programming (1, 6, 10), vocals (1, 6, 10, 11)
 Kanye West – production, horns (3)
 James Connor – background vocals (2)
 Quishima S. Dixon – background vocals (2)
 Cassandra R. Chism – background vocals (2)
 Jason McGee and The Choir – choir (2)
 Thomas James Levesque – horn, keyboards (2)
 Jasper Harris – keyboards, strings (2)
 Noel Goring – organ (2)
 Jack Harlow – lead vocals, background vocals (3)
 Nick Lee – horn (3, 9)
 Raul Cubina – programming (3)
 Ryan Svendsen – trumpet (3)
 Maclean Porter – vocals (3, 6, 9)
 KBeazy – background vocals, keyboards, programming (4)
 Blake Slatkin – background vocals, keyboards, programming (4)
 Ryan Tedder – background vocals, keyboards, programming (4)
 Doja Cat - featured vocals, background vocals (6)
 John Cunningham – bass, drums (7, 8, 12); guitar (7, 8, 12, 14), keyboards (8); piano, strings (12)
 Jack Ward – cello (7, 8, 14, 15)
 Ben Ward – double bass (7, 8, 10, 14)
 Jasper Sheff – drum machine, piano (7); guitar (14)
 Elton John – piano (7)
 William K. Ward – strings (7, 8, 10–12, 14, 15)
 18yoman – strings (7, 8, 10–12, 14, 15)
 Glenn Hopper – strings (7, 12, 14)
 Megan Thee Stallion - featured vocals, background vocals (9)
 Natalie Mavridis - violin (10)
 Lydia Sawires – violin (10)
 Harry Ward – violin (10, 11)
 Freya Schack-Arnott – cello (11)
 Nick Seeley – drums (11)
 Carter Lang – bass, drums, guitar, keyboards (12, 14)
 Drew Sliger – background vocals (13)
 Jacques Morel – background vocals (13)
 Hannah Storm – background vocals (13)
 Mervin Hernandez – background vocals (13)
 Delisa Shannon – background vocals (13)
 Nick Mira – bass, keyboards, programming (13)
 Jaden Wiggins – bass (13)
 Martin Rodrigues – drums (13)
 Dylan Wiggins – guitar (13)
 Hello Yello – keyboards (13)
 DT – keyboards (13)
 Miley Cyrus – featured vocals, background vocals (15)
 Ben Adler – violin (15)

Technical

 Chris Gehringer – mastering engineer (1, 2, 5–10, 12–15)
 Eric Lagg – mastering engineer (3, 11)
 Randy Merrill – mastering engineer (4)
 Serban Ghenea – mixing engineer (1, 4, 7, 11)
 Patrizio "Teezio" Pigliapoco – mixing engineer (2, 3)
 Nickie Jon Pabón – mixing engineer (3), recording engineer (3)
 Denzel Baptiste – mixing engineer (5), recording engineer (1–3, 5–7, 9, 11, 13, 15)
 David Biral – mixing engineer (5), recording engineer (6), assistant engineer (2, 3, 5–15)
 Manny Marroquin – mixing engineer (6, 9, 10, 13)
 Jon Castelli – mixing engineer (8)
 Joe Visciano – mixing engineer (12, 14)
 Roy Lenzo – recording engineer (1, 3, 6, 7, 11, 15)
 Drew Sliger – recording engineer (2, 5, 8, 9, 12, 14), assistant engineer (1–3, 5, 7–15)
 Blake Slatkin – recording engineer (4)
 Ryan Tedder – recording engineer (4)
 John Cunningham – recording engineer (7, 8, 12, 14)
 Kuk Harrell – recording engineer (7, 11, 12, 15), vocal engineer (11)
 Jelli Dorman – recording engineer (7, 10, 11, 12, 15)
 Josh Deguzman – engineer (8)
 John Hanes – engineer (11)
 Mervin Hernandez – assistant engineer (1–3, 5–12, 14, 15)
 David Dickenson – assistant engineer (1–3, 5–12, 14, 15)
 Ashley Jackson – assistant engineer (2, 3)

Art & photography
 Pilar Zeta – design and art direction
 Charlotte Rutherford – photography

Charts

Weekly charts

Year-end charts

Certifications

Release history

References

External links

 
 

2021 debut albums
Lil Nas X albums
Albums produced by KBeaZy
Albums produced by Kanye West
Albums produced by Nick Mira
Albums produced by Omer Fedi
Albums produced by Ryan Tedder
Albums produced by Take a Daytrip
Columbia Records albums
LGBT-related albums
Pop-rap albums